Michael John Lewis (born 11 January 1939 in Penparcau near Aberystwyth, Wales) is a Welsh composer, primarily of film music. As a child Lewis was classically trained as a choirboy, organist and pianist, and attended the Guildhall School of Music and Drama. After graduating in the early 1960s he taught music for two years in Tottenham, North London, where he came into contact with popular music for the first time (primarily The Beatles and Bond film scores).

He wrote a musical, Please, Sir, which Brian Forbes and Richard Attenborough of Beaver Films took an early interest in filming. Those plans came to nothing, but when John Barry (already engaged on The Lion in Winter) was too busy to score Forbes' next film The Madwoman of Chaillot (1969), Forbes asked Lewis to come to Nice for a four-day trial, during which he wrote the main theme.  Although The Madwoman of Chaillot was not well received it was a high-profile production, starring Katharine Hepburn. The music (orchestrated by Wally Stott) attracted some additional attention when issued as an album, and subsequently won an Ivor Novello Award in 1970.

The following year Lewis composed the scores for Upon This Rock starring Dirk Bogarde and Orson Welles, which was premiered at the 1970 Venice Film Festival, and then for Julius Caesar starring Charlton Heston and John Gielgud. While this was once again poorly received, it established Lewis as a film composer. From London he went on to score multiple films throughout the 1970s and early 1980s, notably the 1973 British comedy horror film Theatre of Blood, directed by Douglas Hickox, a vehicle for Vincent Price. He moved to the US in 1984, first to Los Angeles and then in 2005 to Austin, Texas.

As well as films, Lewis wrote music for many commercials, and composed the score for the 1973 Broadway musical Cyrano (text by Anthony Burgess). Later in life he turned to writing choral music and hymns, inspired by and performed in his native Wales. He formed his own record label, Pen Dinas Productions, in 1994, which issued his CD of arrangements The Romantic Splendour of Wales in 2003. He founded the Welsh Choir of Southern California in 1997. Lewis now divides his time between the UK and Mississippi, where he works on gospel-influenced music.

Filmography

The Madwoman of Chaillot (1969)
 Upon This Rock (1970)
The Man Who Haunted Himself (1970)
Julius Caesar (1970)
Unman, Wittering and Zigo (1971)
Running Scared (1972)
Theatre of Blood (1973)
Baxter! (1973)
11 Harrowhouse (1974)
92 in the Shade (1975)
Russian Roulette (1975)
The Stick Up (1977)
The Medusa Touch (1978)
The Legacy (1978)
The Lion, the Witch and the Wardrobe (1979)
The Passage (1979)
North Sea Hijack (1980)
The Unseen (1980)
Sphinx (1981)
Yes, Giorgio (1982)
The Hound of the Baskervilles (1983)
On the Third Day (1983)
The Naked Face (1984)
Bad Manners (1984)
The Rose and the Jackal (1990)
Deadly Target (1994)

References

External links

Official site (via archive.org)

1939 births
People from Aberystwyth
People from Penparcau
Alumni of the Guildhall School of Music and Drama
British film score composers
British television composers
Welsh composers
Welsh male composers
Ivor Novello Award winners
Living people